Worb Dorf railway station is a railway station in the municipality of Worb, in the Swiss canton of Bern. It is the eastern terminus of the  gauge  of Regionalverkehr Bern-Solothurn.

Services 
The following services stop at Worb Dorf:

References

External links 
 
 

Railway stations in the canton of Bern
Regionalverkehr Bern-Solothurn stations